"Same Ol' Situation (S.O.S.)" is a song by Mötley Crüe from their 1989 album Dr. Feelgood. Released in 1990 as the album's fifth single, it peaked at #78 on the Billboard Hot 100 and #34 on the Mainstream Rock charts. According to VH1 Classic All-Time Top 10, the song is about lesbianism.

Music video
The video was shot July 7, 1990 during a concert at the Alpine Valley Music Theatre. The video is dedicated to their fans.

Personnel
 Vince Neil - Vocals, rhythm guitar
 Mick Mars - Lead Guitar
 Nikki Sixx - Bass
 Tommy Lee - Drums

Charts

References

External links

1990 singles
Mötley Crüe songs
Songs written by Tommy Lee
Songs written by Mick Mars
Songs written by Vince Neil
Songs written by Nikki Sixx
Music videos directed by Wayne Isham
1989 songs
Elektra Records singles
LGBT-related songs
Song recordings produced by Bob Rock